The 1928–29 season was the 32nd in the history of the Western Football League.

The Division One champions this season were Bristol Rovers Reserves. The winners of Division Two were the returning Bath City Reserves. There was no promotion or relegation between the two divisions this season.

Division One
The number of clubs in Division One was reduced from eleven to eight after Salisbury City and Weymouth were relegated to Division Two. Lovells Athletic also left, joining the Southern League. No new teams joined the league.

Division Two
Weymouth Reserves, Poole Reserves and Minehead all left the league, but Division Two was increased from eight to nine clubs after two clubs were relegated from Division One and two new clubs joined.

Bristol St George, rejoining the league after leaving in 1903.
Bath City Reserves, rejoining the league after leaving in 1926.
Salisbury City, relegated from Division One.
Weymouth, relegated from Division One.

References

1928-29
4